Srníček or Srnicek is a surname of Czech origin. Notable people with the surname include:

Nick Srnicek (born 1982), Canadian writer and academic
Pavel Srníček (1968–2015), Czech professional footballer

Czech-language surnames